Los Americans is an eight-part series that focuses on a multi-generational, middle-income Latino family living in Los Angeles. The show was written and directed by Dennis Leoni and released in 2011.

Plot
The Valenzuela family live in Los Angeles in a multi-generational household. Lee and his mother Lucia differ on how to deal with the problems that arise including alcoholism, teenage rebellion and immigration difficulties. The Valenzuela family is totally assimilated in U.S. American culture, and that's the way the patriarch, Leandro Valenzuela, or “Lee” as Leandro prefers to be called, likes it. He's moved on from speaking Spanish and the ways of the old country. As he proudly says, “We’re not Mexicans. Mexicans live in Mexico. We’re Americans.” Lee is right in that he and his family will face many of the problems and challenges all Americans face, that all human beings face – unemployment, homelessness, alcoholism, teenage pregnancy, abortion, immigration, childhood obesity and others. But Lee will also face another problem in that he has forgotten his native language and moved away from his culture, ultimately losing part of who he is and where he comes from, and he will learn that maybe this is not such a good thing. Welcome to a story about real Americans... Los Americans.

Episodes

Cast 
Esai Manuel Morales, Jr. (born October 1, 1962) is an American actor. He played Bob Valenzuela in the 1987 biopic La Bamba. He also appeared in the PBS drama American Family and in the Showtime series Resurrection Blvd. He is best known for his roles as Lt. Tony Rodriguez on NYPD Blue, Joseph Adama in the science fiction television series Caprica, and Camino del Rio in the Netflix original series Ozark. He played Lee Valenzuela in Los Americans- The Truth Hurts (2011) ... Lee Valenzuela - Happy Birthday (2011) ... Lee - Going to Mexico (2011) ... Lee Valenzuela - The Legacy ... Lee - Secrets ... Lee Valenzuela - Lead Us Not Unto Temptation ... Lee Valenzuela - Fish and House Guests ... Lee Valenzuela - Family Heirloom ... Lee
 Lupe Ontiveros was an American actress best known for portraying Yolanda Saldívar in the film Selena. She acted in numerous films and television shows, often playing a maid or, near the end of her career, an all-knowing grandmother. She was nominated for an Emmy Award for her work on Desperate Housewives and received critical acclaim for her role in Chuck & Buck, for which she won the National Board of Review award for Best Supporting Actress, and was also nominated for an Independent Spirit Award. as Lucia Valenzuela : - The Truth Hurts (2011) ... Lucia Valenzuela- Happy Birthday (2011) ... Lucia - Going to Mexico (2011) ... Lucia Valenzuela - The Legacy ... Lucia - Secrets ... Lucia Valenzuela - Lead Us Not Unto Temptation ... Lucia Valenzuela - Fish and House Guests ... Lucia Valenzuela - Family Heirloom ... Lucia
 JC Gonzalez, Juan Camilo Gonzalez, known professionally as JC Gonzalez, is a Colombian actor and singer-songwriter. His career began in 2009, when he participated in television commercials and advertisements in Texas. Gonzalez was also a candidate on Making Menudo, an MTV reality show for which they selected twenty-five bilingual male singers. Gonzalez has also made appearances in film and television, such as Parks and Recreation, Blue (web series) and Los Americans as Paul Valenzuela : - The Truth Hurts (2011) ... Paul Valenzuela- Happy Birthday (2011) ... Paul - Going to Mexico (2011) ... Paul Valenzuela - The Legacy ... Paul - Secrets ... Paul Valenzuela - Lead Us Not Unto Temptation ... Paul Valenzuela - Fish and House Guests ... Paul Valenzuela - Family Heirloom ... Paul
Raymond Cruz is an American actor, best known for his starring role as Detective Julio Sanchez in the series The Closer and his recurring role as the drug lord Tuco Salamanca in the crime drama Breaking Bad and its spin-off Better Call Saul. He also starred on the series Major Crimes, a spinoff of The Closer, reprising the role of Sanchez Beside his role in Los Americans as Memo: - The Truth Hurts (2011) ... Memo - Happy Birthday (2011) ... Memo - Going to Mexico (2011) ... Memo - The Legacy ... Memo - Lead Us Not Unto Temptation ... Memo - Fish and House Guests ... Memo - Family Heirloom ... Memo
Tony Plana (born April 19, 1952), better known as Tony Plana, is a Cuban American actor and director. He is known for playing Betty Suarez's father, Ignacio Suarez, on the ABC television show Ugly Betty and also for voicing Manuel "Manny" Calavera in the video game Grim Fandango. and in Los Americans as Max : - Happy Birthday (2011) ... Max - The Legacy ... Max - Lead Us Not Unto Temptation ... Max
 Yvonne DeLaRosa is an American actress, best known for her role on the Imagen award-winning series Los Americans, Yvonne has appeared in films such as Helter Skelter, Mystery Woman: Snapshot, and The Sorrow, in addition to landing roles on TV shows, including How I Met Your Mother, NCIS (TV series), Weeds, and The King of Queens. She has been heralded as 'The face of the new wave of Latino talent' by Jimmy Smits. She is also a serial entrepreneur of two successive cannabis dispensaries , and in Los Americans as Alma Valenzuela: - The Truth Hurts (2011) ... Alma Valenzuela- Happy Birthday (2011) ... Alma - Going to Mexico (2011) ... Alma Valenzuela - The Legacy ... Alma - Secrets ... Alma Valenzuela - Lead Us Not Unto Temptation ... Alma Valenzuela - Fish and House Guests ... Alma Valenzuela - Family Heirloom ... Alma
 Ana Villafañe is an American actress and singer from Miami, Florida, best known for her portrayal of pop icon Gloria Estefan in the Broadway musical On Your Feet! , also in Los Americans as Jennifer Valenzuela: - The Truth Hurts (2011) ... Jennifer Valenzuela- Happy Birthday (2011) ... Jennifer - Going to Mexico (2011) ... Jennifer Valenzuela - The Legacy ... Jennifer - Secrets ... Jennifer Valenzuela - Lead Us Not Unto Temptation ... Jennifer Valenzuela - Family Heirloom ... Jennifer
Written and Directed by Dennis E.Leoni

Awards and recognition

 The Imagen Foundation - Best Drama Web Series, 2012
 Indie Series Awards Nominated, ISA - Best supporting Actress - Drama, 2012 Lupe Ontiveros
 Indie Series Awards Nominated, ISA - Best supporting Actor - Drama, 2012 Raymond Cruz

Alan Greenlee, Vice President of Programs, One Economy stated "this series is an engaging drama that will help millions of riders take action to improve their lives and make informed decisions."

References 

2011 American television series debuts
2010s American drama television series
English-language television shows
Television shows filmed in Los Angeles
Hispanic and Latino American television